Nepheloleuca floridata is a species of geometrid moth in the family Geometridae. It is found in North America, where it has been recorded from Florida and Mexico.

The MONA or Hodges number for Nepheloleuca floridata is 6986.

References

Further reading

 
 
 

Ourapterygini
Moths described in 1883